Justin Goldner is an American music producer, songwriter, arranger and session musician based in New York City, originally from Philadelphia, Pennsylvania.

His performances have been featured on Grammy, Latin Grammy and Tony award-winning projects (Dear Evan Hansen), as well as the Golden Globe winning film The Greatest Showman. He is a frequent contributor to projects by composers Pasek and Paul and Jason Robert Brown, including the latter’s Broadway musical The Bridges of Madison County.

Goldner has been recognized for his mandolin performances with Sting at Carnegie Hall and live on NBC’s Christmas at Rockefeller Center, as well as his live performance with Ben Platt on the 60th Annual Grammy Awards telecast from Madison Square Garden. He also appears in Platt's Live from Radio City Music Hall concert special on Netflix.

As a music producer and songwriter, Goldner is known for drawing upon both acoustic and electronic textures. Since 2009, his work as producer and bandleader of Grace McLean & Them Apples has yielded two albums, combining McLean’s vocal looping techniques with organic instruments. Consecutive performances at Lincoln Center’s American Songbook Series in 2015 and 2016 garnered recognition in the New York Times, in which Stephen Holden wrote: “In the tradition of Bobby McFerrin, [Grace McLean] is also a sonic wizard who multiplies her voice in electronic loops that can turn a singer into a one-person chorus and rhythm section. […] The electronics wove in and out of polyrhythmic jazz and swing arrangements conceived mostly by Justin Goldner, her musical director and bassist.”
Goldner participated in developing the music for Pasek and Paul’s films The Greatest Showman, Spirited, and Lyle, Lyle Crocodile, as well as their musical Dear Evan Hansen, which he ultimately performed on Broadway and in the 2021 film adaptation. He has been featured in other performances with Ricky Martin, Macy Gray, Tori Kelly, Donald Glover, Shawn Mendes, Ledisi, Bruce Springsteen, James Taylor, Idina Menzel, Jordin Sparks, Ludwig Goransson, Ariana DeBose, Matisyahu, Amanda Brown, Steve Martin, John Turturro, Allison Williams, Jane Monheit, Jesse McCartney, Emily Kinney, Audra McDonald, Jeremy Jordan, Cynthia Erivo, Lolo, Grace Weber, Elle Varner, and his mentor, Meshell Ndegeocello. 

Other notable production and songwriting releases have included folk-pop trio Saint Adeline's eponymous debut album, Cinco Paul & Ken Daurio's Bubble Boy, and "Destiny", included on Hasbro's Jem & The Holograms tribute album. Goldner has also performed classically with the Chelsea Symphony and Teatro Graticello, and performed live electronics and sound design with new acoustic crossover group 9 Horses. He is known as well for collaborations with global artists, including Bollywood composers Shankar Mahadevan and Vishal Bhardwaj, Latin Grammy-winning Venezuelan vocalist/trumpeter Linda Briceño and Cuban rock band Del Exilio.

Discography

Production & Songwriting 

Tori Kelly – "Waving Through a Window" (2021)
Ariana DeBose – "Shall We Dance" (2021)
Anne of Green Gables: A New Musical (2020)
Drew Gasparini – We Aren't Kids Anymore (2020)
Mike Tedesco – Hardly Recognizable (2019)
Hey Guy – "Stereo" (2019)
Neisha Grace ft. Natalie Weiss – "Lovestruck" (2018)
Jared Saltiel – Out of Clay (2018)
9 Horses – "The Water Understands" (2017)
Cinco Paul – Bubble Boy [Original Cast Recording] (2017)
Alice J Lee – "In Love With Drew", "Trouble" (2016)
Janet Krupin – Hipster Pinup (2016)
Saint Adeline – Saint Adeline (2016)
Barnaby Bright – "Destiny" (released on Truly Outrageous: A Tribute to Starlight Records, 2015)
Grace McLean & Them Apples – Natural Disaster (2015)
Bri Arden – All The Above (2014)
Abby Bernstein – Talk in Tongues (2012)
Ryan Amador – Symptoms of a Wide-Eyed Being (2012)
Grace McLean & Them Apples – Make Me Breakfast (2012)
Carrie Manolakos – Echo (2012)
Shaina Taub – What Otters Do (2011)

As a Performer

Spirited (Soundtrack from the Apple Original Film) (2022)
Lyle Lyle Crocodile (Original Motion Picture Soundtrack) (2022)
Dear Evan Hansen (Original Motion Picture Soundtrack) (2021)
9 Horses – Omegah (2021)
Janita – Here Be Dragons (2021)
Ben Platt – Sing To Me Instead: Deluxe Edition (2020)
Peppermint – A Girl Like Me: Letters to My Lovers (2020)
Georgia Stitt – A Quiet Revolution (2020)
Kathryn Allison – Something Real (2019)
Linda Briceño – 11 (Ella Bric & the Hidden Figures) (2018)
 Jason Robert Brown – How We React and How We Recover (2018)
 Tim Kubart – Building Blocks (2018)
 Celia Woodsmith – Cast Iron Shoes (2018)
 Dear Evan Hansen (Original Broadway Cast Recording) (2017)
 The Greatest Showman (Original Motion Picture Soundtrack) (2017)
 J3PO – Memory (2017)
Jon Epcar – Morning Drone (2017)
 Clinton Curtis – Getaway Car (2016)
 Dillon Kondor – Hostage (2016)
 Jihae – Illusion of You (2015)
 The Bridges of Madison County (Original Broadway Cast Recording) (2014)
 Del Exilio – Panamericano (2013)
Kerrigan/Lowermilk Live (2013)
 Nick Blaemire & The Hustle (2012)
 Drew Gasparini – I Could Use A Drink (2012)

Orchestration & Arranging 
 Bhangin It (Sam Willmott)
 Karate Kid (Drew Gasparini)
Bubble Boy (Cinco Paul & Ken Daurio)
The Louder We Get (Colleen Dauncey & Akiva Romer-Segal)
Anne of Green Gables (Matte O'Brien & Matt Vinson)
 Deathless (Zack Zadek)
 It's Kind of a Funny Story (Drew Gasparini)
Hood (Lewis Flinn)
 The Space Between Us
 The Daughters (Shaina Taub)
We Aren't Kids Anymore (Drew Gasparini)

References

External links 
 
 
 Justin Goldner discography on AllMusic
 Justin Goldner discography on Discogs
 Justin Goldner Broadway credits on IBDb

American multi-instrumentalists
Record producers from New York (state)
American session musicians
Musicians from New York City
Musicians from Philadelphia
Record producers from Pennsylvania
Year of birth missing (living people)
Living people